Twice Branded is a 1936 British drama film directed by Maclean Rogers and starring James Mason, Robert Rendel and Lucille Lisle. It was made at Walton Studios as a quota quickie.

Premise
A man returning home after serving a prison sentence tries to rebuild his relationship with his family and prevent his son becoming embroiled with the same criminal gang which had led to his own conviction.

Cast
 Robert Rendel as Charles Hamilton  
 Lucille Lisle as Betty Hamilton  
 James Mason as Henry Hamilton  
 Eve Gray as Sylvia Hamilton  
 Mickey Brantford as Dennis Hill  
 Ethel Griffies as Mrs. Etta Hamilton  
 Isobel Scaife as Mary  
 Paul Blake as Lord Hugo Winstanley 
 Neville Brook as Marcus Leadbetter  
 Ethel Royale as Miss Miller  
 Wally Patch as James Kaley

References

Bibliography
 Low, Rachael. Filmmaking in 1930s Britain. George Allen & Unwin, 1985.
 Wood, Linda. British Films, 1927-1939. British Film Institute, 1986.

External links

1936 films
1936 drama films
Films directed by Maclean Rogers
British drama films
British black-and-white films
Films set in London
Quota quickies
Films shot at Nettlefold Studios
1930s English-language films
1930s British films